Giorgi Chelebadze (born 1 January 1992) is a Georgian professional football player, currently playing for Shukura Kobuleti .

Personal life
His father, Revaz was also a footballer, playing for FC Dinamo Tbilisi and USSR national football team.

External links
 

1992 births
Living people
Footballers from Georgia (country)
Expatriate footballers from Georgia (country)
Expatriate footballers in Russia
FC Fakel Voronezh players
People from Kobuleti
FC Rubin Kazan players
Association football forwards